Oxyrhopus marcapatae, Boulenger's false coral snake, is a species of snake in the family Colubridae.  The species is native to  Peru.

References

Oxyrhopus
Snakes of South America
Reptiles of Peru
Endemic fauna of Peru
Reptiles described in 1902
Taxa named by George Albert Boulenger